Populus lasiocarpa, commonly called the Chinese necklace poplar, is a species of poplar native to humid forests of China. It is closely related to Populus wilsonii, Wilson's poplar.

Description
Populus lasiocarpa is known for its large leaves that may reach dimensions of 35 × 25 cm. The stalk reaches a length of 20 cm and the bottom sides of the leaves are very hairy. The buds have a length of 3 cm. Shoots are sturdy, angular and fluffy. The petals grow on 25 cm long catkins and produce round, woolly fruit.

This species blooms from March to May with the fruits ripening from May to June.

Wilson's poplar differs from it in that the former's leaves are not hairy underneath and are generally smaller with a flattened petiole and resinous buds.

Distribution
The native distribution of Populus lasiocarpa comprises the temperate zones of China including the provinces of Guizhou, Hubei, Shaanxi, Sichuan and Yunnan. It prefers fresh to moist clay soil which is lightly basic to alkaline, on sunny locations. The species thrives in warm temperatures but is most often winter-hardy.

Taxonomy
Populus lasiocarpa is a species of poplar in the family Salicaceae. It was first described by Daniel Oliver in 1890.

There are two known varieties:
Populus lasiocarpa var. lasiocarpa with 15 to 24 cm long female and 1 to 1.7 cm long shortly-stalked fruit,

Use
The Chinese necklace poplar is an important log tree in its area of distribution. In Central Europe, the tree is often used as an ornamental plant but is of no distinct forestral importance.

References

External links

lasiocarpa
Flora of China